Up, also known as Up Money  and Up Banking, is an Australian neobank based in Melbourne, Victoria, Australia with more than 400,000 mostly young Australian customers. Founded in 2018, Up was created as a collaboration between software development company Ferocia and Bendigo & Adelaide Bank.

History 
Up was founded in 2017 as a collaboration between software company Ferocia and Bendigo & Adelaide Bank. The companies were already closely tied as Ferocia was already building Bendigo Bank's app. 

Up announced on 28 March 2018 that it would support Apple Pay, Google Pay, Fitbit Pay and Garmin Pay at launch. On 13 May 2018 Up started its friends and family beta phase with a closed beta release on 2 August 2018. Siri integration was then pushed out to beta users on 25 August 2018. An invite system was introduced on 1 October 2018 to allow existing users to "invite a friend" through their mobile number and allow them to skip the waitlist before Up officially launched to the public on 9 October 2018, holding launch events in Melbourne and Sydney. The bank then held a stage at the annual gaming convention PAX in Melbourne on 26 October 2018.

On 8 November 2018 Up was officially the first neobank in Australia to provide instant Apple Pay provisioning, allowing consumers to add their card to their Apple Wallet before receiving their physical card. Bank transfers via the New Payments Platform were then enabled on 21 November 2018 to a small group of users before having a full rollout on 13 December 2018. The bank then teamed up with buy now, pay later company Afterpay, allowing Up users to link their app with Afterpay thus providing "smarter transaction viewing" as well as reminders on when their next payment would be via the "regulars" tab, a tab which was originally meant for subscriptions and direct debits. Up announced that they had 30,000 customers four months after their public launch.

Up then won "Exceptional Everyday Account" and "Regular Savers" awards from Mozo's annual Expert Choice Deposit Awards.

Gamification of their account via Pull to Save released on 14 March 2019, allowing customers to pull their screen and release their cents to their savings. On the next day, Up announced support for WatchOS and released their first Apple Watch app. Samsung Pay support was then released on 10 April 2019. On 12 June 2019 Up announced that they had reached 100,000 customers whilst announcing on 18 June 2019 that Up had also rolled out instant Google Pay provisioning, one of the first banks in Australia to do so.

Up then qualified and won "Digital Disrupter of the Year", "Best Tech Innovation" and "Best Banking Innovation" awards from the annual Finder Awards. Scheduled and repeated payments as well as a new Salary Identification feature were then released on 10 September 2019. Up made a reappearance at PAX on 11 October 2019. On 15 October 2019, following digital banks such as Monzo in the UK and N26 in Europe, the bank announced a partnership with international payments service TransferWise via the "TransferWise for Banks" model with a private beta for November and an expected public release in Q4 of 2019. This makes Up Banking the first in the Asia-Pacific region to integrate TransferWise APIs.

On 16 October 2019, Up held its first meetup at Panama Dining Room in Fitzroy, Victoria with the slogan #upspringtree. During the event, Up announced its extension to the current roadmap (known as a tree) and announced features such as salary splitting, released on the same day and transactional-saving covering.

In 2021 Ferocia was listed as Australia's 8th Best Place To Work  in technology, and Up was chosen as a brand to watch by Interbrand.

On 16 August 16 2021, shortly after Up grew to 400,000 customers, Up announced the successful merging of its founding partners, with Bendigo & Adelaide Bank acquiring Ferocia, including the remaining stake in Up and Ferocia's IP. 

Up now operates as an independent arm of Bendigo & Adelaide Bank.

Products 
Up offers transaction and savings accounts. These are applied for and managed via a mobile app, and include features such as automatic saving of rounded transaction amounts, and analysis of spending patterns and locations.

All accounts support the New Payments Platform, including PayID and Osko transfers. Transactions can be made using a variety of contactless payment solutions including Google Pay and Apple Pay. Payments are displayed in a conversational format, similar to Venmo and Beem It.

References 

Banks of Australia
Banks established in 2018
Australian companies established in 2018